Bagrichthys micranodus is a species of bagrid catfish endemic to Indonesia where it is found in western Borneo.  It grows to a length of 18.5 cm.

References
 

Bagridae
Freshwater fish of Asia
Freshwater fish of Indonesia
Fish described in 1989